Rodolfo Manuel Lopes Lima (born 5 May 1980) is a former Cape Verde international footballer.

Career
The striker signed with the Bulgarian club after canceling his contract with S.L. Benfica, а club he belonged to for the past three years but where he never played. He is known for his long runs and speed in which he currently has scored 5 goals in 28 games this season 06/07. He was born in Cascais Portugal but opted to play for his Parents land Cape Verde. He was born on May 5, 1980. Lima became the first footballer from Cape Verde to play in the A PFG.

Former clubs are CF Os Belenenses, Gil Vicente FC and Portimonense Sporting Clube, where he played loaned by S.L. Benfica. The Lisbon team signed the player after he conquered the Junior National League with FC Alverca.

References

External links
Player Profile at National-Football-Teams

1980 births
Living people
Sportspeople from Cascais
Cape Verdean footballers
Cape Verde international footballers
S.L. Benfica footballers
Portimonense S.C. players
F.C. Alverca players
OFC Vihren Sandanski players
First Professional Football League (Bulgaria) players
Expatriate footballers in Bulgaria
Cape Verdean expatriates in Bulgaria
Portuguese expatriates in Bulgaria
Association football forwards